Aleph Institute (North East US) is a Jewish humanitarian organization based in Pittsburgh, Pennsylvania. They provide various religious and humanitarian services for Jewish inmates in prisons and jail across the North Eastern US, as well as for their families. They also provide social services for the local Jewish community, including supporting food security.

History
Aleph Institute (North East US) was founded in 1991 by Rabbi Moishe Mayir Vogel, following the founding of the Aleph Institute in Florida in 1981.  He was sent by Rabbi Menachem Mendel Schneerson to ensure the Jews incarcerated in the North East were provided for, with the responsibly stretching from Virginia northwards, and Ohio eastwards. In 2009 they inaugurated their new center in Squirrel Hill.

Prison Services
Aleph Institute's rabbis and volunteers visit prisons regularly, to teach and encourage Jewish inmates, and to ensure their needs and religious rights are cared for. This includes arranging for Kosher meals, Tefillin, and special meals for Jewish holidays.
Aleph is also involved in re-entry services, providing housing, employment, and religious assistance. According to research, the recidivism rate, normally at 76%, falls to just 8% when Aleph is involved. The New York Times has noted Aleph as a "well-known force" in criminal justice issues.

Torah Weekly
Aleph Institute creates a weekly one-page newsletter, which includes thoughts on the weekly Torah portion, as well as short summaries of events from Jewish history. It is distributed online, and is available for inmates in prison.

Project Shifra
Aleph Institute's Project Shifra, named for the biblical Shifra, provides social services, including a Kosher food bank, family counseling, and women and children's' programing for local Orthodox Jewish communities.

See also

Aleph Institute
European Aleph Institute

References

External links
 Aleph Institute North East US official website
 

Prison charities based in the United States
Jewish charities based in the United States
Chabad organizations
Religious prison-related organizations
Chabad in the United States
Jews and Judaism in Pittsburgh
Orthodox Judaism in Pennsylvania